The Nakajima B5N (Allied reporting name "Kate") was the standard carrier-based torpedo bomber of the Imperial Japanese Navy (IJN) for much of World War II. It also served as a high level bomber.

Although the B5N was substantially faster and more capable than its Allied counterparts, the American Douglas TBD Devastator monoplane (the U.S. Navy's first all-metal, carrier-borne monoplane of any type with retracting gear), and the British Fairey Swordfish and Fairey Albacore torpedo biplanes, it was nearing obsolescence by 1941. Nevertheless, the B5N operated throughout the whole war, due to the delayed development of its successor, the B6N.

In the early part of the Pacific War, when flown by well-trained IJN aircrews and as part of well-coordinated attacks, the B5N achieved particular successes at the battles of Pearl Harbor, Coral Sea, Midway, and Santa Cruz Islands.

Design and development
The B5N was designed by a team led by Katsuji Nakamura in response to a 1935 specification by the Navy for a torpedo bomber to replace the Yokosuka B4Y. Internally designated Type K by Nakajima, it successfully competed with the Mitsubishi B5M for a production contract. The first prototype flew in January 1937 and was ordered into production soon afterwards with the full designation Type 97 Carrier Attack Bomber (九七式艦上攻撃機) (kyū-nana-shiki kanjō kōgeki-ki or kankō for short).

Combat experience during the Second Sino-Japanese War revealed several weaknesses in the original B5N1 production model. These were mainly concerned with the lack of protection that the design offered its crew and its fuel tanks. Keen to maintain the high performance of the type, the Navy was reluctant to add weight in the form of armor, and instead looked to obtaining a faster version of the aircraft in the hopes of outrunning enemy fighters. The B5N2 was given a much more powerful engine - Nakajima's own Sakae Model 11, 14-cylinder twin-row radial, as used in the initial models of the Mitsubishi A6M fighter – and various modifications were made to streamline it. Although its performance was only marginally better, and its weaknesses remained unremedied, this version replaced the B5N1 in production and service from 1939.

Equipment

The navigator/bombardier/observer position was equipped with a Type 90 bombsight, which was a long vertical tube located in the front-left of the seat. There was also a Type 3 reflector compass for precise navigation that was mounted on the top of the cockpit frame. The radio-operator/gunner position was equipped with one of the standard-issue radio sets for navy three-seater aircraft (Type 96 Mk3 earlier and Type 2 Mk3 later) that was mounted in front of the radio-operator/gunner's seat and behind the navigator/bombardier/observer's seat.

The radio-operator/gunner also operated one flexible 7.7 mm (.303 in) Type 92 machine gun at the rear end of the cockpit. One Type 91 torpedo could be mounted on the racks that were fixed eccentrically to the right at the bottom of the fuselage. Alternatively, racks could be replaced to carry either one 800 kg bomb (e.g., Type 99 No 80 armor-piercing bomb) or two 250 kg bombs (e.g., Type 98 No 25 land bomb) or six 60 kg bombs (e.g., Type 2 No 6 land bomb). Replacing the racks and exchanging between the torpedo and bombs was not a trivial process and could take more than two hours to complete.

Initially, most of the B5N bombers were painted in silver, which was the color used throughout the early stages of the Second Sino-Japanese War. The color eventually changed to dark green before the start of the Pacific War.

Operational history

The B5N was primarily employed as a carrier-based aircraft and occasionally as a land-based bomber. It carried a crew of three: pilot, navigator/bombardier/observer, and radio-operator/gunner. Like with other IJN multi-seat aircraft, an individual bomber was commanded by the senior ranking crew member aboard, which could be the observer rather than the pilot.

The initial model B5N1 first saw action in the Second Sino-Japanese War in 1938. The updated, B5N2 played a major role in the Attack on Pearl Harbor. One of B5N2's carried Mitsuo Fuchida, the commander of the attack, with one high-level bomber from the carrier  credited with sinking the battleship . Five torpedo bombers were shot down in the first wave.

B5N2 torpedo bombers normally performed a coordinated attack on enemy carriers with Aichi D3A dive bombers. Ideally, dive bombers would help to suppress the ship's anti-aircraft fire, which improved the chances of success for the slow-flying torpedo bombers. During the Battle of the Eastern Solomons, IJN tried to minimize losses to torpedo bombers and initially sent only the dive bombers to attack and cripple US carriers for the subsequent torpedo strike, this proved unsuccessful, as the torpedo bombers did not launch until the battle was over.

The B5N served as the basis for a follow-on design, the B6N, which eventually replaced it in front-line service. The B5N continued to fly in secondary roles, such as training, target towing, and anti-submarine warfare. Some of the aircraft used for this latter purpose were equipped with early radars and magnetic anomaly detectors. B5Ns were also used as bombers during the unsuccessful defense of the Philippines in October 1944, suffering severe losses. Later in the war, they were used for kamikaze attacks.

Variants
Type K:Prototype.
B5N1:First production model.
B5N1-K:Many B5N1s were converted into advanced training aircraft.
B5N2:Improved version.

Operators

 Imperial Japanese Navy

Use by Indonesia Guerrilla

Surviving aircraft

None of the 1,150 production B5Ns survived World War II intact. Only two partially-recovered B5Ns are known to exist, neither of them airworthy.

Replicas of the B5N2s were made using stretched fuselages from U.S. Canadian Car and Foundry "Harvard" - a variant of the North American T-6 Texan trainers, which were modified to represent Japanese aircraft for the movie Tora! Tora! Tora!, and have been used in a number of movies and airshows since to depict the aircraft.

One recovered B5N2 is at the Wings Museum in Balcombe, West Sussex, UK. This large portion was recovered from the Kuril Islands by a British private collector in 2003.

A B5N was unveiled at the Pacific Aviation Museum in Honolulu, Hawaii on 18 April 2016.

Specifications (Nakajima B5N2)

See also

References

Notes

Bibliography
 Angelucci, Enzo and Paolo Matricardi. World Aircraft: World War II, Volume II (Sampson Low Guides). Maidenhead, UK: Sampson Low, 1978. .
 
 
 Francillon, René J. Japanese Bombers of World War Two, Volume One. Windsor, Berkshire, UK: Hylton Lacy Publishers Ltd., 1969. .
 
 
 .

External links

 https://www.pearlharboraviationmuseum.org/pearl-harbor-blog/nakajima-b5n2/ 
 Nakajima B5N, Joao Paulo Julião Matsuura
 Pictorial of B5N in multiplayer air-combat simulation of Battle of Coral Sea.

Low-wing aircraft
Carrier-based aircraft
B05N, Nakajima
B5N, Nakajima
B05N
Attack on Pearl Harbor
Single-engined tractor aircraft
Aircraft first flown in 1937
Retractable conventional landing gear